The Baitul Muslimin Mosque is a mosque in Su'ao Township, Yilan County, Taiwan. It is the first mosque in Yilan County.

History
The mosque was established in 2014 when a group of fishermen from Indonesia working in the area were looking for a place of worship. Soon later, the building was renovated to what it is today.

Architecture
The mosque is housed on the upper floor of a two-story yellow building. The lower floor of the building is used for the administration office of the Indonesian Sailor Communication Forum in Taiwan. The building is rented for a monthly cost of NT$15,000.

Activities
The mosque regularly holds various Muslim-related activities and festivals. It is also the center of gathering for fishermen working in the nearby ports, such as the Nanfang'ao Fishing Port. The mosque is also the center for information and complaint center for the migrant workers from Indonesia.

Transportation
The mosque is accessible within walking distance south east of Su'ao Station of Taiwan Railways.

See also
 Islam in Taiwan
 List of mosques in Taiwan

References

2014 establishments in Taiwan
Buildings and structures in Yilan County, Taiwan
Mosques completed in 2014
Mosques in Taiwan